Gary L. Stevens is the name of

 Gary Stevens (politician), Gary Lee Stevens (born 1941), Republican member of the Alaska Senate 
 Gary Stevens (jockey), Gary Lynn Stevens (born 1963), American Thoroughbred horse racing jockey, actor, and sports analyst

See also
Gary Stevens (disambiguation)